Interpretation may refer to:

Culture
 Aesthetic interpretation, an explanation of the meaning of a work of art
 Allegorical interpretation, an approach that assumes a text should not be interpreted literally
 Dramatic Interpretation, an event in speech and forensics competitions in which participants perform excerpts from plays
 Heritage interpretation, communication about the nature and purpose of historical, natural, or cultural phenomena
 Interpretation (music), the process of a performer deciding how to perform music that has been previously composed
 Language interpretation, the facilitation of dialogue between parties using different languages
 Literary theory, methods for interpreting literature, including historicism, feminism, structuralism, deconstruction
 Oral interpretation, a dramatic art

Law
 Authentic interpretation, the official interpretation of a statute issued by the statute's legislator
 Financial Accounting Standards Board Interpretations, part of the United States Generally Accepted Accounting Principles (US GAAP)
 Interpretation Act, a stock short title used for legislation relating to interpretation of legislation
 Judicial interpretation, an interpretation of law by a judiciary
 Statutory interpretation, determining the meaning of legislation

Math and computing
 Interpretation (model theory), a technical notion that approximates the idea of representing a logical structure inside another structure
 Interpretation function, in mathematical logic a function that assigns functions and relations to the symbols of a signature
 Interpretations of quantum mechanics, a set of statements which attempt to explain how quantum mechanics informs our understanding of nature
 Interpreted language, a programming language in which programs are directly executed by an interpreter
 Interpretability, a concept in mathematical logic

Media
 Interpretation centre, an institution for dissemination of knowledge of natural or cultural heritage
 Interpretations: A 25th Anniversary Celebration, an album by The Carpenters

Neuroscience
 Interpretation of dreams (disambiguation)

Philosophy 
 Interpretation (philosophy), the assignment of meanings to various concepts, symbols, or objects under consideration
 Interpretation (logic), an assignment of meaning to the symbols of a formal language
 De Interpretatione, a work by Aristotle
 Exegesis, a critical explanation or interpretation of a text
 Hermeneutics, the study of interpretation theory
 Semantics, the study of meaning in words, phrases, signs, and symbols
 Interpretant, a concept in semiotics

Religion
 Biblical interpretation, the study of the principles of interpretation concerning the books of the Bible
 Interpretation (Catholic canon law), in the Catholic Church, rules for the exact interpretation and acceptation of words
 Interpretation (journal), an academic journal that covers the field of Presbyterian biblical studies
 Interpretation of Knowledge, a codex in the Nag Hammadi library of early Christian Gnostic texts
 Interpretation of tongues, a supernatural ability to understand unknown languages

See also
 Interpreter (disambiguation)
 Derivative (disambiguation)
 Imitation
 Mimicry
 Translation (disambiguation)